Zdzisław Jan Zamoyski (c. 1591–1670) was a Polish nobleman (szlachcic). He became Podstoli of Lwów in 1646 and castellan of Czerniechów in 1656.

He married Anna Zofia Lanckorońska and had five children: Marianna Zamoyska, Mikołaj Zamoyski, Eufrozyna Zamoyska, Marcin Zamoyski and Jan Kazimierz Zamoyski.

1590s births
1670 deaths
Zdzislaw Jan